Zabawski (feminine:Zabawska) is a Polish noble surname of Zabawa coat of arms. Russian-language versions of the surname are Zabavsky / Zabavskaya.

Notable people with the surname include:

Daria Zabawska (born 1995), Polish discus thrower
Krystyna Zabawska (born 1968), Polish shot putter
 (born 1975), Polish shot putter  
Sergey Zabavsky (born 1974), Tajik long-distance runner 

Polish-language surnames